Boat Yard Crossing Halt railway station was a short-lived station on the Tarleton Branch. It was situated near the River Asland and served as the only intermediate station on the line. The site has long since been demolished and is now occupied by a housing estate.

References

Disused railway stations in Lancashire
Former Lancashire and Yorkshire Railway stations
Railway stations in Great Britain opened in 1912
Railway stations in Great Britain closed in 1913
1912 establishments in England
1930 disestablishments in England
Closed railway lines in England